Vigilius may refer to:
 Pope Vigilius (died 555), Pope 537-555
 Vigilius of Trent (-405), bishop, martyr and saint
 Church of Saint Vigilius of Trent (Pinzolo)
 Vigilius of Thapsus, 5th-century bishop and writer
 Vigilius Eriksen (1722-1782), Danish painter
 Vigilius (amphibian), an extinct genus of amphibian

See also